Pope Pius XII (1939–1958)   canonized numerous  saints, including Pope Pius X and Maria Goretti. He beatified Pope Innocent XI.

The Saints

The first canonizations of Pope Pius XII were two women, the founder of a female order, Mary Euphrasia Pelletier, and a nanny and housekeeper, Gemma Galgani. Pelletier had  a reputation for opening new ways for Catholic charities, helping people in difficulties with the law, who so far were neglected by the system and the Church. Galgani was an unknown woman whose virtue, charity and devotion became model by her canonization.

The saints are:

He named Saint Casimir the patron saint of all youth.  Saint Catherine of Siena  and   Saint Francis of Assisi were named Patron Saints of Italy on 5 May 1940 just before Italy entered the Second World War.

Pope Pius XII opened the canonization procedures for Pope Pius IX, who was beatified by Pope John Paul II.

Pius X

On 29 May 1954, less than three years after his beatification, Pius X was canonized, following recognition of two more miracles. The first involved Francesco Belsami, an attorney from Naples who had a fatal pulmonary abscess, who was cured after placing a picture of Pope Pius X upon his chest. The second miracle involved Sr. Maria Ludovica Scorcia, a nun who had a serious neurotropic virus, and who, after several novenas, was entirely cured. The Canonization mass was presided over by Pius XII at Saint Peter's Basilica before a crowd of about 800,000 of the faithful and church officials at St. Peter's Basilica. Pius X became the first Pope to be canonized since the 17th century.

Maria Goretti

Pope Pius XII canonized Saint Maria Goretti as a virgin and martyr saint of the Roman Catholic Church. Maria's mother, nicknamed "Mamma Assunta" by her neighbors, was present at the ceremony; she was the first mother ever to attend the canonization ceremony of her child, along with her four remaining sons and daughters. Her murderer Alessendro also was present at the canonization.

Because of the huge number of visitors, the canonisation of Maria Goretti by Pope Pius XII,  was held outside at Piazza San Pietro on 24 June 1950. The Pope spoke, not as before in Latin, but in Italian. "We order and declare, that the blessed Maria Goretti can be venerated as a Saint and We introduce her into the Canon of Saints". Some 500,000 people, among them a majority of youth, had come from around the World. Pope Pius asked them:
 Young people, pleasure of the eyes of Jesus, are you determined to resist any attack on your chastity with the help of grace of God?
A resounding Yes was the answer.

Innocent XI 

Pope Innocent XI, personally a holy man, was highly controversial even hated, because of his opposition to the French monarchy and its aspirations for European hegemony; but also for his family's engagement in money-lending.  He opposed  French attempts to usurp the traditional liberties of the Church, for example in nominating its bishops. He opposed Gallicanism, the Gallican Liberties demanded by the French king. The case for his canonization was introduced in 1714 but the strong emotional and political influence of France forced a postponement until Pope Pius XII, who reintroduced the case, announced his beatification on 7 October 1956.

Placet Eugenio
The Placet Eugenio was the required final approval  by the Pope of proposed candidates.  Not all, who had passed the Vatican tribunals, received the Placet Eugenio. In one instance, Pius found, that the candidate, supposedly a model of virtue,  had consistently used foul language.  Refusing to accept the Vatican defense, that this kind of language was custom in that region, he stopped the proceedings shortly before their conclusion. Another person, belonging to a large religious order, was refused the honour of the altars, because he turned out to be a chain smoker. "Monsignore, as long as I am alive, this Causa will not find approval". This case too was almost completed and the relatives and members of the order were quite disappointed.

American Saints
According to Halecki and Murray,  Pius has shown a particular interest in the discovery and recognition of sanctity among American religious leaders and pioneers of the Church movement. The first "American" saint was canonized during his pontificate, when Mother Cabrini, an Italian born nun with American citizenship, was raised to sainthood in St. Peter's Basilica. Pius also accelerated the canonization of other Americans, including  American born Mother Seton of Emmitsburg,  Maryland,  founder  of the Sisters of Charity. Fourteen  months after his death,  she was declared Venerable and was later beatified by Pope John XXIII and canonized by Pope Paul VI. Pope Pius supported also the case of  an  American Indian  woman from the Mohawk tribe, Saint Kateri Tekakwitha, who was declared  "Venerable" by him in 1943.

Beatifications 
Among the persons beatified   by Pius XII,  a majority are women, with Spanish, Italian and French backgrounds and others.

See also 
List of saints canonized by Pope Leo XIII
List of saints canonized by Pope Pius XI
List of saints canonized by Pope John XXIII
List of saints canonized by Pope Paul VI
List of saints canonized by Pope John Paul II
List of saints canonized by Pope Francis

Sources

 Oskar Halecki, James Murray, Jr. Pius XII, Eugenio Pacelli, Pope of Peace, New York, 1954
 Pascalina Lehnert, Pius XII, Ich durfte ihm dienen, Würzburg, 1982
 Jan  Olav Smit,  Pope Pius XII, London & Dublin 1951

References

Pius XII